Hunter "Spike" Schuppisser Carlyle (born May 6, 1993) is an American mixed martial artist who competes in the Featherweight and Lightweight divisions of Bellator MMA. He is most well known for his time spent fighting in the Ultimate Fighting Championship (UFC).

Background

Carlyle started doing karate when he was four years old, and later began wrestling when he was 12. He wrestled for about four years and then started jiu-jitsu. When he was 15, he fell in love with Pride FC and Japanese MMA, which inspired him to become an MMA fighter.

Mixed martial arts career

Early career

Starting his career in 2017, Spike compiled a record of 8–1, fighting for a variety of regional California promotions, most notably for Legacy Fighting Alliance.

Ultimate Fighting Championship

Carlyle made his UFC debut at UFC Fight Night: Benavidez vs. Figueiredo on February 29, 2020 as a late replacement for Steven Peterson against Aalon Cruz. He won the fight via first-round TKO.

Carlyle next faced Billy Quarantillo at UFC on ESPN: Woodley vs. Burns on May 30, 2020 in a catchweight bout. He lost the bout via a unanimous decision.

Carlyle faced Bill Algeo at UFC on ESPN: Smith vs. Clark on November 28, 2020. He lost the bout via unanimous decision.

On February 4, 2021, it was announced that Carlyle had been released from his UFC contract.

Post UFC Career

Carlyle faced Batsumberel Dagvadorj on March 26, 2021 at LFA 103. He won the fight via rear-naked choke in the first round.

Carlyle faced Gil Guardado on June 9, 2021 at Ballys Fight Night. He won the bout via armbar at the end of the first round.

Carlyle faced J. J. Ambrose on October 17, 2021 at Cage Warriors 130. He won the bout via knockout in the second round.

Bellator MMA 
Carlyle, as a replacement for Ricardo Seixas, faced Dan Moret on December 3, 2021 at Bellator 272. Despite absorbing heavy punishment throughout the fight and being down on all three judges scorecards, Carlyle rallied in the third round winning the fight via rear-naked choke, choking Moret unconscious.

After the win, Carlyle signed a multi-fight deal with Bellator.

As part of the cross promotion between Rizin and Bellator, Carlyle faced Koji Takeda on April 17, 2022 at Rizin 35. He won the fight by a second-round guillotine choke.

Carlyle faced A. J. McKee on October 1, 2022 at Bellator 286. At weigh ins, Carlyle missed weight, coming .6 pounds over the division non-title fight limit at 156.6 lbs and was fined 20% of his purse and the bouts continued at catchweight. In a wild and bloody bout, Carlyle came out of it with an unanimous decision loss.

Carlyle is scheduled to face the Rizin Lightweight champion Roberto de Souza in a non-title bout at Rizin 42 on May 6, 2023.

Mixed martial arts record

|-
|Loss
|align=center|14–4
|A. J. McKee
|Decision (unanimous)
|Bellator 286
|
|align=center|3
|align=center|5:00
|Long Beach, California, United States
|
|-
|Win
|align=center|14–3
|Koji Takeda
|Technical Submission (guillotine choke)
|Rizin 35
|
|align=center|2
|align=center|1:35
|Chōfu, Japan
|
|-
|Win
|align=center|13–3
|Dan Moret
|Technical Submission (rear-naked choke)
|Bellator 272
|
|align=center|3
|align=center|2:58
|Uncasville, Connecticut, United States
|
|-
| Win
| align=center|12–3
| J.J. Ambrose
|KO (punch)
|Cage Warriors 130
|
|align=center|2
|align=center|1:19
|San Diego, California, United States
|
|-
| Win
| align=center|11–3
| Gil Guardado
|Submission (armbar)
| Ballys Fight Night
| 
| align=center|1
| align=center|4:56
| Long Beach, California, United States
|
|-
| Win
| align=center|10–3
| Batsumberel Dagvadorj
|Submission (rear-naked choke)
| LFA 103
| 
| align=center|1
| align=center|4:00
| Shawnee, Oklahoma, United States
|
|-
| Loss
| align=center|9–3
| Bill Algeo
|Decision (unanimous)
| UFC on ESPN: Smith vs. Clark
| 
| align=center|3
| align=center|5:00
| Las Vegas, Nevada, United States
|
|-
| Loss
| align=center|9–2
| Billy Quarantillo
| Decision (unanimous)
|UFC on ESPN: Woodley vs. Burns
|
|align=center|3
|align=center|5:00
|Las Vegas, Nevada, United States
|
|-
| Win
| align=center|9–1
| Aalon Cruz
|TKO (punches)
|UFC Fight Night: Benavidez vs. Figueiredo 
|
|align=center|1
|align=center|1:25
|Norfolk, Virginia, United States
|
|-
| Win
| align=center|8–1
| Jean-Paul Lebosnoyani
| KO (punches)
| Lights Out Xtreme Fighting 4
| 
| align=center| 1
| align=center| 1:50
| Burbank, California, United States
|
|-
| Win
| align=center| 7–1
| Matthew Colquhoun
| KO (spinning backfist)
| LFA 74
| 
| align=center|1
| align=center|3:58
| Riverside, California, United States
|
|-
| Win
| align=center| 6–1
| Fernando Padilla
| Decision (unanimous)
| CXF 17
|
|align=center|3
|align=center|5:00
|Los Angeles, California, United States
| 
|-
| Win
| align=center| 5–1
| Brian Del Rosario
| Submission (rear-naked choke)
| Combate Americas: Road to Copa Combate
|
|align=Center|2
|align=center|2:41
|Long Beach, California, United States
| 
|-
| Loss
| align=center| 4–1
| Serob Minasyan
| Decision (split)
| CXF 12
| 
| align=center| 3
| align=center| 5:00
| Burbank, California, United States
| 
|-
| Win
| align=center| 4–0
| Joseph Rodriguez
| Submission (rear-naked choke)
| California Cage Wars 4
| 
| align=center| 1
| align=center| 2:02
| Valley Center, California, United States
| 
|-
| Win
| align=center| 3–0
| Rhageem Wells
| TKO (punches)
| California Cage Wars 2: Cuero vs. Cannon
| 
| align=center| 1
| align=center| 0:55
| Valley Center, California, United States
| 
|-
| Win
| align=center| 2–0
| Raymell Davis
| KO (punch)
| Gladiator Challenge: Fight Club
| 
| align=center| 1
| align=center| 0:05
| El Cajon, California, United States
|
|-
| Win
| align=center| 1–0
| Callum Highland
| Submission (armbar)
| California Cage Wars: Peralta vs. Smith
| 
| align=center| 1
| align=center| 1:52
| Valley Center, California, United States
|

See also 
 List of current Bellator MMA fighters
List of male mixed martial artists

References

External links 
  
 

1992 births
Living people
American male mixed martial artists
Featherweight mixed martial artists
Mixed martial artists utilizing karate
Mixed martial artists utilizing wrestling
Mixed martial artists utilizing judo
Mixed martial artists utilizing Brazilian jiu-jitsu
Ultimate Fighting Championship male fighters
Sportspeople from San Diego
Mixed martial artists from California
American practitioners of Brazilian jiu-jitsu
American male judoka
American male karateka